The Taça de Portugal de Futsal is the main Portuguese national futsal knock-out competition. It has been played yearly since 1997 and is organized by the Portuguese Football Federation. Sporting CP are the current champions and record holders of the competition, winning the last 5 out of 6 competitions, with the 2021 competition cancelled due to Covid-19.

Taça de Portugal finals

Performance By club

External links
 Futsalplanet site

Futsal
Futsal competitions in Portugal
National futsal cups